Gregory Pinas (born April 17, 1984) is a former Dutch basketball player who played one season in the Dutch Basketball League for BSW during the 2003–04 season.

References

External links
 eurobasket.com profile

1984 births
Living people
BSW (basketball club) players
Dutch Basketball League players
Dutch men's basketball players
Small forwards